Live at Wacken Open Air 2007 is a video by the American thrash metal band Overkill, released on February 5, 2008 through Bodog Music.

Track listing
All songs written by Overkill, except *.
 "Rotten To The Core"
 "Elimination"
 "Necroshine"
 "Thanx For Nothin'"
 "Skull and Bones"
 "In Union We Stand"
 "Walk Through Fire"
 "Wrecking Crew "
 "Old School"
 "Fuck You"* (Subhumans cover)

Personnel
Bobby Ellsworth - lead vocals
D. D. Verni - bass, backing vocals
Dave Linsk - lead guitar, backing vocals
Derek Tailer - rhythm guitar, backing vocals
Ron Lipnicki - drums

References 

Overkill (band) video albums
2008 live albums
2008 video albums
Live video albums